Chliaria is a butterfly genus in the family Lycaenidae. The species of this genus are found in the Indomalayan realm.

Species
The genus includes the following species:

 Chliaria balua Moulton, 1911 Borneo (Sarawak), Sumatra, Peninsular Malaya
 Chliaria kina (Hewitson, 1869)
 Chliaria othona (Hewitson, 1865)
 Chliaria pahanga Corbet, 1938 Peninsular Malaya
 Chliaria tora (Kheil, 1884) Nias, Sumatra

External links

 "Chliaria Moore, 1884" at Markku Savela's Lepidoptera and Some Other Life Forms

 
Lycaenidae genera
Taxa named by Frederic Moore